A Song Inside My Head, a Demon in My Bed is a studio album by Oh Laura, released on 23 May 2007.

Track listing
A Call to Arms 
It Ain't Enough
Release Me
Black N' Blue
Fine Line
Raining in New York
Out of Bounds
Thunderbird Motel
The Mess You Left Behind
Killer on the Road
Friend Like Me

Charts

Weekly charts

Year-end charts

References

2007 debut albums
Oh Laura albums